This is a list of iwi (New Zealand Māori tribes).

List of iwi

This list includes groups recognised as iwi (tribes) in certain contexts. Many are also hapū (sub-tribes) of larger iwi.

Moriori are included on this list. Although they are distinct from the Māori people, they share common ancestors.

Map of iwi

See also
 List of Māori waka
 Lists of marae in New Zealand
 Ngāti Rānana

References

External links
Iwi Hapū Names List from the National Library of New Zealand
Te Kāhui Māngai (directory of iwi and Māori organisations) from Te Puni Kōkiri
 Statistical Standard for Iwi (2000)
 2006 Census information

 Iwi and hapu
Iwi
Iwi